The 1984 United States presidential election in Illinois took place on November 6, 1984. All 50 states and the District of Columbia, were part of the 1984 United States presidential election. State voters chose 24 electors to the Electoral College, which selected the president and vice president of the United States.

Illinois was won by incumbent United States President Ronald Reagan of California, who was running against former Vice President Walter Mondale of Minnesota. Reagan ran for a second time with former C.I.A. Director George H. W. Bush of Texas, and Mondale ran with Representative Geraldine Ferraro of New York, the first major female candidate for the vice presidency.

As of 2020, this is the last time a Republican presidential candidate won over 1 million votes in Cook County, the state's most populous county. The presidential election of 1984 was a very partisan election for Illinois, with over 99% of the electorate voting only either Democratic or Republican, though several other parties did appear on the presidential ballot in the State. Nearly every county in Illinois voted in majority for Reagan. One notable exception to this trend was Chicago's highly populated Cook County, which voted in majority for Mondale, albeit with a 2.6% margin, or 51% to 48.4%. 1984 marks the last time any presidential candidate won Cook County with a single-digit margin, and the last election that a Republican won over a million votes in that county.

Illinois weighed in for this election as 4 percentage points more Democratic than the national average. , this is the last election in which Jackson County voted for a Republican presidential candidate. Reagan won the election in Illinois with a decisive 13 point landslide, carrying all but five counties. No Republican candidate has received as strong of support in the American Great Lakes States, at large, post-Reagan. While Illinois typically voted conservative at the time, the election results in Illinois are also reflective of a nationwide reconsolidation of base for the Republican Party which took place through the 1980s; called by Reagan the "second American Revolution." This was most evident during the 1984 presidential election. Notably, this is the closest to date that a Republican has come to carrying Cook County, home to Chicago, since Richard Nixon won it in 1972. Mondale took 51% of Cook County's vote to Reagan's 48.4%.

Primaries
The primaries and general elections coincided with those for other federal offices (Senate and House), as well as those for state offices.

Turnout
Turnout in the state-run primary elections (Democratic and Republican) was 37.25% with a total of 2,254,503 votes cast.

Turnout during the general election was 74.48%, with 4,819,088 votes cast.

State-run primaries were held for the Democratic and Republican parties on March 20.

Democratic

The 1984 Illinois Democratic presidential primary was held on March 20, 1984, in the U.S. state of Illinois as one of the Democratic Party's statewide nomination contests ahead of the 1984 presidential election.

Republican

The 1984 Illinois Republican presidential primary was held on March 20, 1984, in the U.S. state of Illinois as one of the Republican Party's statewide nomination contests ahead of the 1984 presidential election.

Democratic platform
Walter Mondale accepted the Democratic nomination for presidency after pulling narrowly ahead of Senator Gary Hart of Colorado and Rev. Jesse Jackson of Illinois - his main contenders during what would be a very contentious Democratic primary. During the campaign, Mondale was vocal about reduction of government spending, and, in particular, was vocal against heightened military spending on the nuclear arms race against the Soviet Union, which was reaching its peak on both sides in the early 1980s.

Taking a (what was becoming the traditional liberal) stance on the social issues of the day, Mondale advocated for gun control, the right to choose regarding abortion, and strongly opposed the repeal of laws regarding institutionalized prayer in public schools. He also criticized Reagan for what he charged was his economic marginalization of the poor, stating that Reagan's reelection campaign was "a happy talk campaign," not focused on the real issues at hand.

A very significant political move during this election: the Democratic Party nominated Representative Geraldine Ferraro to run with Mondale as vice-president. Ferraro is the first female candidate to receive such a nomination in United States history. She said in an interview at the 1984 Democratic National Convention that this action "opened a door which will never be closed again," speaking to the role of women in politics.

Republican platform

By 1984, Reagan was very popular with voters across the nation as the President who saw them out of the economic stagflation of the early and middle 1970's, and into a period of (relative) economic stability.

The economic success seen under Reagan was politically accomplished (principally) in two ways. The first was initiation of deep tax cuts for the wealthy, and the second was a wide-spectrum of tax cuts for crude oil production and refinement, namely, with the 1980 Windfall profits tax cuts. These policies were augmented with a call for heightened military spending, and the cutting of social welfare programs for the poor. Collectively called "Reaganomics", these economic policies were established through several pieces of legislation passed between 1980 and 1987.

Virtually unopposed during the Republican primaries, Reagan ran on a campaign of furthering his economic policies. Reagan vowed to continue his "war on drugs," passing sweeping legislation after the 1984 election in support of mandatory minimum sentences for drug possession.  Furthermore, taking a (what was becoming the traditional conservative) stance on the social issues of the day, Reagan strongly opposed legislation regarding comprehension of gay marriage, abortion, and (to a lesser extent) environmentalism, regarding the final as simply being bad for business.

Results

Results by county

See also
 Presidency of Ronald Reagan
 United States presidential elections in Illinois

References

Illinois
1984
1984 Illinois elections